Chabeřice is a municipality and village in Kutná Hora District in the Central Bohemian Region of the Czech Republic. It has about 300 inhabitants.

Administrative parts
Villages and hamlets of Brandýs, Čížov and Holšice are administrative parts of Chabeřice.

History
The first written mention of Chabeřice is from 1092.

References

Villages in Kutná Hora District